Opie Percival Read (born December 22, 1852, Nashville Tennessee; d. November 2, 1939, Chicago Illinois) was an American journalist and humorist.  His bibliography lists 60 published books.

As a journalist
Prior to 1887, Opie Read edited five separate newspapers, all in the U.S. South: the Statesville Argus, the Bowling Green Pantograph, and the Louisville Courier-Journal, all in Kentucky, as well as the Evening Post, and Gazette in Little Rock, Arkansas. The Gazette was a predecessor of the Arkansas Democrat-Gazette.  In 1882, Read founded his own humor magazine, the Arkansas Traveler, which he carried on after leaving newspaper journalism in 1887.

As a novelist
Read brought the Arkansas Traveler, a flowing pen, and a command of Southern dialect to Chicago in 1887.  He spent the remainder of his life in the ”Windy City.”

Read's bibliography shows that in his first 20 full years in Chicago (1888–1908) he published 54 separate books, of which 31 were novels, 18 were book-length compilations of short fiction such as that published in the Arkansas Traveler, and five were works of non-fiction.

As a novelist, Read is credited with bringing the phrase "There's a sucker born every minute" into print in his 1898 novel A Yankee from the West, although the phrase seems to have been in verbal use before this and is often credited to P.T. Barnum.

After 1908, Read appears to have gone into semi-retirement.  His authorial productivity noticeably slackened during the thirty remaining years of his life, although he did publish six additional books (two of them juveniles).

His reputation
Read's works carried titles like A Kentucky Colonel (Laird & Lee, 1890), The Jucklins (1896), and Opie Read in the Ozarks: Including Many of the Rich, Rare, Quaint, Eccentric, Ignorant and Superstitious Sayings of the Natives of Missouri and Arkansaw (1905).

Read's standing was affected by the fact that many of his works, such as The Jucklins, were published as dime novels.  Many later critics have dismissed Read as a presenter of lower-class white Southern stereotypes for middle-class Northerners.

Works 
 A Kentucky Colonel (1890)
 The Colossus (1893)
 The Wives of the Prophet (1894)
 The Jucklins (1896)
 Bolanyo (1897)
 Old Ebenezer  (1897)
 A Yankee from the West (1898)
 Judge Elbridge (1899)
 In the Alamo (1900)
 My Young Master
 Up Terrapin River
 An Arkansas Planter
 The Starbucks (1902)
 The Harkriders (1903)

Filmography

The Kentucky Colonel (1920)

References

External links
Opie Read biography at University of Tennessee - Chattanooga
 
 

1852 births
1939 deaths
People from Nashville, Tennessee
Writers from Chicago
Writers from Tennessee
American male journalists
American humorists
Dime novelists